Patti Yasutake (born September 6, 1953) is an American film and television actress. She is best known for her portrayal of Nurse Alyssa Ogawa in the Star Trek franchise. She is the sister of Irene Hirano.

Her television acting career began in 1985 with an appearance on the show T.J. Hooker. More recently, she appeared on Boston Legal. She resides in Hollywood, California. She is married.

Partial filmography
 Tales of Meeting and Parting (1984)
 Gung Ho (1986) ... as Umeki
 Gung Ho (1986) (TV series) ... as Umeki Kazuhiro
 The Wash (1988) ... as Marsha
 Without Warning: The James Brady Story (1991) (TV movie) ... as Therapist
 Fatal Friendship (1991) (TV movie) ... as Ling Landrum
 Stop! Or My Mom Will Shoot (1992) ... as TV Newscaster Leslie
 Blind Spot (1993) (TV movie) ... as Dr. Charbonneau
 Donato and Daughter (1993) (TV movie)
 Lush Life (1993) (TV movie) ... as Doctor
 Star Trek: The Next Generation (1994) ... as Nurse Alyssa Ogawa (16 episodes)
 Star Trek Generations (1994) ... as Nurse Alyssa Ogawa
 Dangerous Intentions (1995)
 Abandoned and Deceived (1995) (TV movie)
 Road to Galveston (1996) (TV movie) ... as Nurse Dickerson
 Star Trek: First Contact (1996) ... as Nurse Alyssa Ogawa
 Clockwatchers (1997) ... as Theater Woman (uncredited)
 A Face to Kill For (1999) ... as D.A. Rowland
 Drop Dead Gorgeous (1999) ... as Mrs. Howard
 The Mutant Watch (2000) (TV movie)
 Star Trek: Armada II (2001) (voice) ... as Additional Voices
 ER (2003) ... as Kito
 Cold Case (2007) (TV Series) ... as Barbara Takahashi

References

External links

1953 births
American actresses of Japanese descent
American film actresses
American film actors of Asian descent
American television actresses
Living people
Actresses from California
21st-century American women